Kikkajärv (also Kika järv, Suur-Kikkajärv) or Ilgājs as it is known in Latvia, is a lake on the border of Estonia and Latvia.
Its area is 20.2 ha. Lake is in the Veclaicene Protected Landscape Area.

See also
List of lakes of Estonia

References

Lakes of Estonia
Lakes of Latvia
Estonia–Latvia border
International lakes of Europe